Victoria Louise Pendleton,  (born 24 September 1980) is a British jockey and former track cyclist who specialised in the sprint, team sprint and keirin disciplines. She is a former Olympic, World, European and Commonwealth champion. With two Olympic gold medals and one silver, Pendleton is one of Great Britain's most successful female Olympians.

Pendleton represented Great Britain and England in international cycling competition, winning nine world titles including a record six in the individual sprint, dominating the event between 2005 and 2012. In 2008 she won the sprint in the Beijing Olympics, and in 2012, she won the gold medal in the keirin at the London Olympics, as well as silver in the sprint.

She was appointed Member of the Order of the British Empire (MBE) in the 2009 New Year Honours and Commander of the Order of the British Empire (CBE) in the 2013 New Year Honours for services to cycling. As a gold medalist at European, World and Olympic level, Pendleton is also a member of the European Cycling Union Hall of Fame.

Early life
Pendleton and her twin brother Alex were born on 24 September 1980 at Stotfold, Bedfordshire, England, to Max Pendleton, a keen cyclist and former British National 8 km grass track cycling champion, and Pauline Viney. She has an older sister, Nicola Jane.

Career

Early years
Pendleton rode her first race, a 400m event on the grass track at Mildenhall Cycling Club's Fordham Sports Day and Grass-Track meeting at nine. Pendleton showed her promise at 13 and was spotted three years later by the assistant national track coach, Marshal Thomas. At that time she wanted to concentrate on her education at Fearnhill School in Letchworth Garden City, and later a degree in Sport and Exercise Science by Northumbria University, Newcastle upon Tyne. She enjoyed some success on the track as a student before graduating and becoming a full-time cyclist.

Journey to the top
Pendleton won one bronze and three silver medals in the British National Track Championships in 2001, while still a student. Between 2002 and 2004 she was a trainee at the World Cycling Centre in Aigle, Switzerland. She qualified for the 2002 Commonwealth Games team, finishing fourth in the sprint. She again came fourth in the sprint at the 2003 UCI Track Cycling World Championships in Stuttgart and the 2004 UCI Track Cycling World Championships in Melbourne. She ranked 2nd overall in the World Cup for the sprint in 2004, winning the World Cup event in Manchester.

At the 2004 Summer Olympics, she finished sixth in the time trial and ninth in the 200 m sprint.

Pendleton won her first major medal with gold in the sprint at the 2005 UCI Track Cycling World Championships. She became the third British woman to become a cycling world champion in 40 years.

At the 2006 Commonwealth Games in Melbourne, she won silver in the 500 m time trial and gold in the sprint.

At the 2007 UCI Track Cycling World Championships, she won the team sprint with Shanaze Reade, the individual gold in the sprint, and a third gold in the keirin. She crowned the year by being named Sunday Times Sportswoman of the Year for 2007, becoming the first cyclist to win the award in its 20-year history. Pendleton was also voted Sports Journalists' Association's sportswoman of the year for 2007.

During her build-up to the Olympics she won two gold medals at the 2008 UCI Track Cycling World Championships in the sprint, and the team sprint, again with Reade. She was also second in the keirin. At the 2008 Summer Olympics, Pendleton won the gold medal in the sprint.

She retained her title in the sprint at the 2009 UCI Track Cycling World Championships in Pruszków. Each sprint was so closely matched it required several photos, leaving Pendleton emotional but victorious over her Dutch opponent, Willy Kanis.

At the 2011 UCI Track Cycling World Championships Pendleton won a silver in the team sprint, a bronze medal in the sprint and finished seventh in the keirin. Partnering Jess Varnish, Pendleton won the team sprint in her only event at the British Championships. At the 2011 European Track Championships Pendleton won the team sprint and keirin titles, but only came eighth in the sprint.

In February 2012 Pendleton and Varnish set a new world team sprint record of 32.754 seconds, beating Kaarle McCulloch and Anna Meares of Australia at the Track World Cup in the London Velodrome. In the sprint and the keirin Pendleton came 4th and 5th respectively. In Pendleton's final 2012 UCI Track Cycling World Championships she won the sprint, her sixth title. She fell in the first heat of the semi-final against Meares. In the second heat Meares was relegated for going outside her lane. In the decider Pendleton won in a photo finish before defeating Simona Krupeckaitė, winning 2–0 with the second win coming from another relegation. Pendleton finished without medals in her other two events.

At the 2012 Summer Olympics, Pendleton and Varnish broke the world record in the qualifying stages of the team sprint before being relegated in the semi-finals. She recovered to win a gold medal in the keirin. Pendleton set a new Olympic record of 10.724 seconds in the qualifiers of the sprint but lost in the final to Anna Meares, after being controversially relegated in the first run and being beaten in the second run, earning a silver medal. This would be Pendleton's final competitive race as she retired from professional cycling.

Horse racing
In March 2015, Pendleton announced her intention to become a jockey with the aim of competing at the Foxhunter Chase at the 2016 Cheltenham Festival, with guidance from horse trainer Paul Nicholls. She made her competitive debut in August 2015, finishing second in the Betfair Novice Flat Amateur Riders' Handicap at Ripon riding Royal Etiquette. She won her first race on 2 March 2016, guiding 5–4 favourite Pacha Du Polder to victory at Wincanton.

On 18 March 2016, Pendleton, again riding Pacha Du Polder, achieved her ambition of participating in the 2016 Foxhunter Chase, at Cheltenham, outperforming many pundits' expectations by finishing fifth. She described the result as "probably the greatest achievement of my life".

Outside sport

Pendleton featured on the cover of the July 2009 issue of men's magazine FHM. She featured in the January 2012 issue of Harper's Bazaar magazine. In February 2012, Halfords released a Pendleton branded range of women's bikes including the Somerton (a city bike), the Initial (a road bicycle) the Brooke and the Dalby (both hybrid bikes) on which Pendleton herself had worked as a design consultant. She was a "brand ambassador" for Pantene hair-care products in the advent to London 2012. She was the subject of a BBC television programme which first aired in July.

Pendleton was a contestant on series 10 of Strictly Come Dancing, in which her professional partner was Brendan Cole. She was the seventh of the fourteen celebrities to leave the show on 25 November.

Pendleton's autobiography Between the Lines was published following her retirement in September 2012.

At the 2014 Conservative Party Conference, Pendleton introduced the Secretary of State for Education Nicky Morgan before her keynote speech on 30 September, speaking about the importance of sport in education. She said, "if you want more children to leave school healthy and prepared for life in modern Britain, with everything that will be thrown at them, you might as well give them a sporting chance."

In 2016 Pendleton partnered with Clinique, joining as a Difference Maker for the Clinique Difference Initiative, with an aim to inspire women and support the provision of educational and healthcare support.

In May 2018 she was forced to abandon a charity Everest ascent that she was doing with TV presenter Ben Fogle at Base Camp 2 at 6400 m (20,977 ft) when she experienced hypoxia, caused by a lack of oxygen. Fogle managed to reach the summit. It took her three weeks of antibiotics to get over chest and ear infections.

Personal life
Pendleton's relationship with Scott Gardner, a sports scientist with the British Cycling coaching team, caused some problems for the couple, as it was felt to be unprofessional for two members of the team to be romantically involved. Following the 2008 Olympics, when it became more widely known, Gardner was obliged to leave the team, though he was later re-hired. Pendleton and Gardner married in September 2013. In July 2018, Pendleton announced the break up of her marriage.

For her 30th birthday, Pendleton had a line from The Smashing Pumpkins' song "Today" tattooed onto her right arm. In 2012, she was living in Wilmslow, Cheshire, but subsequently moved to the Chilterns.

In 2019, Pendleton stated that she had suffered severe depression and had contemplated suicide after her failed Everest expedition, and an "unpleasant" divorce from her husband.

In 2019 Pendleton competed on Channel 4's SAS Celebrity SU2C, "Who Dares, Wins" series. During COVID-19 in 2020 she posted on Instagram that she was fortunate to share lockdown with Louis Tinsley, ex-SBS operator and co-founder of clothing firm ThruDark, whom she is dating.

Pendleton was accused of creating a "toxic atmosphere" during the filming of ITV's "Don't Rock The Boat" in November 2020 by crew mate Craig Charles. Defending herself she suggested her twin brother Alex, as a man, would have been treated differently. In 2021 she co-commentated on the woman's road racing cycling final as part of the BBCs Olympic 2020 coverage as their pundit in Tokyo.

Palmarès

2002
National Track Championships
1st  Sprint
1st  500 m time trial
2003
National Track Championships
1st  Sprint
1st  500 m time trial
1st  Keirin
1st  Scratch race
2004
National Track Championships
1st  Sprint
1st  500 m time trial
2005
1st  Sprint, World Track Championships
National Track Championships
1st  Sprint
1st  500 m time trial
1st  Keirin
1st  Scratch Race
2006
Commonwealth Games
1st  Sprint
2nd  Time trial
2nd  Sprint, World Track Championships
National Track Championships
1st  Sprint
1st  500 m time trial
1st  Keirin
1st  Scratch race
1st  National Derny Championship
2007
World Track Championships
1st  Sprint
1st  Team sprint (with Shanaze Reade)
1st  Keirin
National Track Championships
1st  Sprint
1st  500 m time trial
1st  Keirin
1st  National Derny Championship
2008
1st  Sprint, Olympic Games
World Track Championships
1st  Sprint
1st  Team sprint (with Shanaze Reade)
2nd  Keirin
National Track Championships
1st  Sprint
1st  Team sprint (with Anna Blyth)
1st  Keirin
3rd Sprint, Grand Prix de Vitesse de Saint Denis 
2009
World Track Championships
1st  Sprint
2nd  Team sprint (with Shanaze Reade)
3rd  500 m time trial
National Track Championships
1st  500 m time trial
1st  Sprint
2010
World Track Championships
1st  Sprint
2nd  Keirin
2011
1st  Team sprint (with Jessica Varnish), European Track Championships
World Track Championships
2nd  Team sprint (with Jessica Varnish) 
3rd  Sprint
2012
Olympic Games
1st  Keirin
2nd  Sprint
1st  Sprint, World Track Championships

See also 

 List of multiple Olympic gold medalists
 List of Olympic medalists in cycling (women)
 2012 Olympics gold post boxes in the United Kingdom
 List of British cyclists
 Cycle Republic

References

Bibliography

External links

British Cycling profile

1980 births
English female cyclists
English jockeys
English autobiographers
Cyclists at the 2004 Summer Olympics
Cyclists at the 2008 Summer Olympics
Cyclists at the 2012 Summer Olympics
Olympic cyclists of Great Britain
Medalists at the 2008 Summer Olympics
Medalists at the 2012 Summer Olympics
Olympic medalists in cycling
Olympic gold medallists for Great Britain
Olympic silver medallists for Great Britain
English Olympic medallists
Cyclists at the 2006 Commonwealth Games
Commonwealth Games gold medallists for England
Commonwealth Games silver medallists for England
UCI Track Cycling World Champions (women)
Commanders of the Order of the British Empire
Alumni of Northumbria University
Twin sportspeople
English twins
People from Stotfold
People educated at Fearnhill School
Living people
Commonwealth Games medallists in cycling
English track cyclists
Women autobiographers
The Sunday Times Sportswoman of the Year winners
Medallists at the 2006 Commonwealth Games